Of Sinners and Saints is a 2015 Philippine thriller film co-written and directed by Filipino Italian filmmaker Ruben Maria Soriquez on his directorial debut. The film stars Soriquez, Raymond Bagatsing, Polo Ravales, and Sue Prado.

Cast 
 Ruben Maria Soriquez as Leonardo Rossellini: Italian missionary doing his mission work in the Philippines
 Chanel Latorre as Merlinda: wife of Franco and former lover of Leonardo
 Polo Ravales as Franco: violent husband of Merlinda
 Raymond Bagatsing as Father Carlos: head of the Parish where Leonardo does his mission
 Althea Vega as Aling Celia: a battered woman who takes shelter in the Parish

Soundtrack 
The film score was composed by Franco Eco, an Italian musician.

Release 
The film was originally released on June 27, 2015 as an entry at the 2015 World Premieres Film Festival. It has been released commercially from April 28 to May 4, 2017 under Cine Lokal, a joint project of SM Cinemas and Cine Lokal of FDCP, meant to give more exposure to independent Philippine films that won awards abroad.

Festivals 
The film (which is technically an Italy-Philippine co-production) was the Italian entry to the 19th Cine Europa, the biggest European Film Festival outside Europe

References

External links

2015 films
Filipino-language films
Films about Catholic priests
2010s Tagalog-language films
Philippine thriller drama films
2015 thriller drama films
2015 directorial debut films
2015 drama films